Self-Defence of the Republic of Poland (SRP) is a nationalist, populist, and agrarian political party and trade union in Poland. Its platform combines left-wing populist economic policies with religious conservative social policies.

Founded by Andrzej Lepper in 1992, the party initially fared poorly, failing to enter the Sejm.  However, it was catapulted to prominence in the 2001 parliamentary election, winning 53 seats, after which it gave confidence and supply to the Democratic Left Alliance government.  It elected six MEPs at the 2004 European election, with five joining the Union for Europe of the Nations and one joining the PES Group.

It switched its support to Law and Justice (PiS) after the 2005 election, in which it won 56 seats in the Sejm and three in the Senate.  Lepper was appointed Deputy Prime Minister in the coalition government with PiS and the League of Polish Families.  In 2007, he was dismissed from his position and the party withdrew from the coalition.  This precipitated a new election, at which the party collapsed to just 1.5% of the vote: losing all its seats.

On August 5, 2011, the Party's leader, Andrzej Lepper, was found dead in his party's office in Warsaw. His death was ruled a suicide by hanging.

History
The party first started in parliamentary elections in 1993, gaining 2.78% votes and failing to enter the Sejm. In the 1995 elections Andrzej Lepper ran for president and gained 1.32% of the votes; in parliamentary elections in 1997, the party took 0.08%. In 2000 Samoobrona organized a campaign of blocking major roads in order to get media attention. Lepper gained 3.05% votes in the presidential elections.

The parliamentary elections in 2001 gave the party 53 seats in the Sejm, with 10.5% support, making it the third largest political force. Although officially a member of the opposition, Samoobrona backed the ruling social democratic Democratic Left Alliance in a number of key votes, giving them the majority needed to stay in power. The party has also marked its presence in the Sejm by unconventional disruptive behavior.

Among their numerous exploits there are such diverse incidents as using their own loudspeakers after being cut off for exceeding the permitted time, or claiming that the largest opposition party (Civic Platform) met with members of the Taliban in Klewki (a village near Olsztyn) to sell them anthrax. Several Samoobrona members of parliament were subject to criminal investigations on charges ranging from forgery to banditry.

In the 2005 elections Samoobrona received a total of 56 seats with 11.4% support. Andrzej Lepper ran for president of Poland in the 2005 election. He received third place and 15% of the vote, a great improvement over his past performances. After the elections Samooborona temporarily shelved its most radical demands and somewhat toned down its rhetoric and along with the League of Polish Families entered into a coalition with the center-right Law and Justice party.

In December 2006 a scandal broke out when Aneta Krawczyk, a local party ex-leader accused Samoobrona leaders, notably Andrzej Lepper and Stanisław Łyżwiński of sexual harassment. Subsequently, the accusation was supported by other females from within the party ranks and the issue of gaining governmental posts in exchange for sex produced a major outcry after Gazeta Wyborcza published the claims. Krawczyk also claimed her then 3-year-old daughter was Stanisław Łyżwiński's child, which proved to be incorrect following DNA testing.

In consequence Andrzej Lepper stated that Gazeta Wyborcza is part of undefined "forces" attempting to launch a coup d'état,
and undermine the coalition with the PiS party, which according to its programme aims at the 'moral rejuvenation' of the nation and the Polish political scene. Despite Samoobrona's leadership's denial of such practices, the evidence supplied by the numerous victims leaves little room for speculation.

In September 2007 the former Polish prime minister Leszek Miller became affiliated with Samoobrona, when he decided to run for the Sejm from their lists.

In February 2016, the party signed a cooperation agreement with the ruling party in Belarus, Belaya Rus.

Ideology
The party's views are populist and isolationist. It has also been described as nationalist. The party wants state-funded agriculture, an increase in government social programs, an end to repayments of the foreign debt, introduction of an additional transaction tax and the use of financial reserves to obtain funding. The party is hostile towards foreign investments.

Poland's June 2003 referendum on membership of the European Union was an uncomfortable experience for Samoobrona. On one hand, the party's isolationism and Euroscepticism led it to call officially for a "no" vote. On the other hand, most political observers believed (correctly) that the Polish  would vote in favour of membership, and as a populist party Samoobrona was unhappy about the likelihood of being on the losing side. In the end, the party fought a rather ambiguous campaign, with its posters carrying the slogan "the decision belongs to you".

In 2005, Samoobrona was a founding member of the EUDemocrats pan-European political party, which professes to unite "centrist" "EU-critical" parties committed to increased democratization.

Economics
Samoobrona had a protectionist attitude toward the country's economy. They wanted to take higher custom tariffs on foreign goods. Party opted for controlling of Narodowy Bank Polski by Sejm. Additionally, the party's leader Andrzej Lepper was in favor of reintroducing PGRs which were state-owned and controlled homesteads existing during the communist era in Poland.

Social issues
Although, Samoobrona was based on the social teaching of Catholic church, the party had right as well as left-leaning elements in its program regarding social issues. Samoobrona supported bringing back of the death penalty to the polish order's law. They were opposed to liberalization of abortion law in Poland and legalisation of euthanasia. However, they took also leftist positions on some matters. Samoobronna was declared in its party platform to legalize civil unions to same-sex couples. Alongside SLD it was the only party who voted in favor of a bill embracing civil unions in 2004. Though party activists of Samoobrona never considered embarrassing the civil unions as an important matter. In its campaign in 2007 Samoobrona called on entirely legalization of marijuana. That was the first party which brought up this theme in published Polish debate.

Election results

Sejm

Senate

European Parliament

Presidential

Regional assemblies

Leadership
 Andrzej Lepper (1992–2011)
 Andrzej Prochoń (2012)
 Lech Kuropatwiński (2012-incumbent)

See also
 League and Self-Defense

References

External links
Samoobrana website

1993 establishments in Poland
Agrarian parties in Poland
Conservative parties in Poland
Catholic political parties
Economic nationalism
Far-right political parties in Poland
Nationalist parties in Poland
Parties related to the Party of European Socialists
Polish nationalist parties
Political parties established in 1993
Political parties in Poland
Trade unions in Poland